Igor Runov (8 February 1963 – 11 April 2011} was a Russian volleyball player who competed for the Soviet Union in the 1988 Summer Olympics and for the Unified Team in the 1992 Summer Olympics. In 1988 he was part of the Soviet team which won the silver medal in the Olympic tournament. He played four matches. Four years later he finished seventh with the Unified Team in the 1992 Olympic tournament. He played six matches.

References

External links 
 

2011 deaths
Soviet men's volleyball players
Olympiacos S.C. players
Olympic volleyball players of the Soviet Union
Olympic volleyball players of the Unified Team
Volleyball players at the 1988 Summer Olympics
Volleyball players at the 1992 Summer Olympics
Olympic silver medalists for the Soviet Union
Olympic medalists in volleyball
Russian men's volleyball players
Sportspeople from Moscow
Medalists at the 1988 Summer Olympics
1963 births